Claudio Romero (born 10 July 2000) is a Chilean track and field athlete competing in the discus throw.

In 2017, he won the gold medal in the men's discus throw event at the 2017 IAAF World U18 Championships held in Nairobi, Kenya.

In 2018, he won the bronze medal in the men's discus throw event at the 2018 IAAF World U20 Championships held in Tampere, Finland.

In 2019, he competed in the men's discus throw event at the 2019 Pan American Games held in Lima, Peru. He did not record a mark. He also won a gold medal in the discus throw at the 2019 Pan American U20 Championships in San José, Costa Rica, extending his national record with a mark of 62.30 meters.

Competing collegiately for the Virginia Cavaliers, Romero was named a first-team All-American and won the ACC outdoor title in 2021. He was the 2022 NCAA discus champion defeating arch rival and NCAA discus record holder Mykolas Alekna,[by two centimeters].Who is the son of legendary Discus thrower Virgilijus Alekna.

References

External links 
 Virginia Cavaliers bio
 

Living people
2000 births
Place of birth missing (living people)
Chilean male discus throwers
Pan American Games competitors for Chile
Athletes (track and field) at the 2019 Pan American Games
World Youth Championships in Athletics winners
Virginia Cavaliers men's track and field athletes
Athletes (track and field) at the 2022 South American Games
South American Games gold medalists for Chile
South American Games medalists in athletics
21st-century Chilean people